Infamous Victory: Ben Chifley's Battle for Coal is a 2008 Australian documentary about the 1949 Australian coal strike. It combines documentary footage with dramatised re-enactments.

Cast
Tony Barry as Ben Chifley
Tracy Mann as Elizabeth Chifley
Lorna Lesley as Phyllis Donnelly
Rhys Muldoon as Edgar Ross
Frankie J Holden as Arthur Calwell
Kieran Darcy-Smith as Don Rogers
Russell Kiefel as Lloyd Ross

Production
The script was written by Bob Ellis who had often written about Chifley. "All my youth and young manhood there was a legend around Labor circles of this perfectly good man, who was an engine driver, and brought up dirt poor, and turned Australia inside out and into something better after the war," he said. "And died too soon, too unjustly."

The film hints that Chifley had an affair with his secretary, Phyllis Donnelly, even though Ellis does not believe it to be the case:
It's unbelievable to me that as dedicated a Catholic as Chifley would experiment with contraception and it's impossible for her not to have got pregnant if it had been on... [although] It's kind of written that way. "But it's written that way on the demand of the historians, who were riding the script like a man on four horses at once... They did not want to say or imply anything that could not be utterly proven before what they feared, I imagine, was a hanging judge. I don't know why they were so worried.
Ellis claims he wrote the script quickly, because he was focusing on the 2007 Australian Federal Election, "For fear that the time lost would lose Labor the election, because I was contributing - as it turned out minimally, but energetically - throughout to the lines said by the politicians and so on. So I wound up with about nine days in a winery and a house rule of no alcohol before 9pm."

Ellis says his main aim was to make the show "as close to the emotional reality of government" as possible and he wanted to depict:
That extraordinary generation of self-educated, working-class men who ran the country for a while. It was an unrepeatable era, really, when none of them had been to university, all of them had worked in a trade, and here they were in charge of armies and economies and so on. It was, as you might say, a noble experiment... It created the Australia we more or less know, which is the multicultural, well-educated, well-hospitalised, well-run, amiable democracy that it's been for a very long time. It created the Australia we had until about 1990, when they started to sell off Qantas and all these stupid things. It was an Australia people increasingly yearn for, I think.

References

External links
Official website at ABC
Infamous Victory at National Film and Sound Archive

Teachers notes for the film
Press kit
Review at News Weekly

Australian television films
2008 television films
2008 films